Azonax is a Neotropical genus of Firetips in the family Hesperiidae.The genus is monotypic containing the single species Azonax typhaon (Hewitson, 1877) present in Mexico, French Guiana and Nicaragua.

References
Natural History Museum Lepidoptera genus database

External links
Butterflies of the Americas Images

Hesperiidae
Hesperiidae of South America
Hesperiidae genera
Monotypic butterfly genera
Taxa named by Frederick DuCane Godman
Taxa named by Osbert Salvin